Cheng Wen-hsing (born 24 February 1982) is a Taiwanese former badminton player. She is now works as German national team coach.

Career 
Cheng competed for Chinese Taipei in the 2004 Olympics in the women's doubles with partner Chien Yu-chin. They defeated Helen Nichol and Charmaine Reid of Canada in the first round but were defeated by Hwang Yu-mi and Lee Hyo-jung of South Korea in the round of 16. Cheng also competed in the mixed doubles with partner Tsai Chia-hsin. They defeated Chris Dednam and Antoinette Uys of South Africa in the first round, but lost to Zhang Jun and Gao Ling of China in the round of 16.

During the 2008 Summer Olympics, Cheng again teamed with Chien Yu-chin in the women's doubles, reaching the quarter-finals. This pair also reached the quarter-finals at the 2012 Summer Olympics. Cheng and her mixed doubles partner, Chen Hung-ling, were less successful and did not qualify from the group stage.

She competed in four Asian Games from 2002 to 2014.

Coaching 
 Malaysia national team for junior players (2016–).
 German national team for doubles players (2019–now).

Achievements

BWF World Championships 
Women's doubles

World Cup 
Women's doubles

Asian Games 
Mixed doubles

Asian Championships 
Women's doubles

Mixed doubles

East Asian Games 
Women's doubles

Summer Universiade 
Women's doubles

Mixed doubles

World University Championships 
Women's doubles

Mixed doubles

Asian Junior Championships 
Mixed doubles

BWF Superseries 
The BWF Superseries, which was launched on 14 December 2006 and implemented in 2007, is a series of elite badminton tournaments, sanctioned by the Badminton World Federation (BWF). BWF Superseries levels are Superseries and Superseries Premier. A season of Superseries consists of twelve tournaments around the world that have been introduced since 2011. Successful players are invited to the Superseries Finals, which are held at the end of each year.

Women's doubles

Mixed doubles

  BWF Superseries Finals tournament
  BWF Superseries Premier tournament
  BWF Superseries tournament

BWF Grand Prix 
The BWF Grand Prix had two levels, the BWF Grand Prix and Grand Prix Gold. It was a series of badminton tournaments sanctioned by the Badminton World Federation (BWF) which was held from 2007 to 2017. The World Badminton Grand Prix sanctioned by International Badminton Federation (IBF) from 1983 to 2006.

Women's doubles

Mixed doubles

  BWF Grand Prix Gold tournament
  BWF & IBF Grand Prix tournament

BWF International Challenge/Series 
Women's doubles

  BWF International Challenge tournament
  BWF International Series tournament

References

External links 

 
 
 
 

1982 births
Living people
Sportspeople from Taipei
Taiwanese female badminton players
Badminton players at the 2004 Summer Olympics
Badminton players at the 2008 Summer Olympics
Badminton players at the 2012 Summer Olympics
Olympic badminton players of Taiwan
Badminton players at the 2002 Asian Games
Badminton players at the 2006 Asian Games
Badminton players at the 2010 Asian Games
Badminton players at the 2014 Asian Games
Asian Games bronze medalists for Chinese Taipei
Asian Games medalists in badminton
Medalists at the 2010 Asian Games
Universiade gold medalists for Chinese Taipei
Universiade silver medalists for Chinese Taipei
Universiade bronze medalists for Chinese Taipei
Universiade medalists in badminton
Medalists at the 2007 Summer Universiade
World No. 1 badminton players
Badminton coaches